Haslum HK is a handball club from Haslum, Norway. They currently compete in the Eliteserien.

European record

External links
 Official website
 EHF Profile

Norwegian handball clubs
Sport in Bærum